Electra, also spelt Elektra, was a daughter of Agamemnon and Clytemnestra in Greek mythology.

Electra or Elektra may also refer to:

Greek mythology 

Electra (Pleiad), one of the Pleiades
 Electra, one of the Danaids, daughter of Danaus and Polyxo
  Electra (Oceanid), the wife of Thaumas and mother of Iris and the Harpies

Animals
 Electra (bryozoan), a genus of aquatic invertebrates
 Elektra (bug), a genus of insects in the tribe Mirini
 Electra (horse), a Thoroughbred racehorse

Art, entertainment, and media

Comics
 Elektra: Assassin (1986), a comics miniseries dedicated to the Marvel character

Fictional characters
 Electra (cat), in T.S. Eliot's Old Possum's Book of Practical Cats and in the musical Cats
 Elektra (character), a Marvel Comics character
 "Electra", Cathy's dog in the Cathy comic strip
 Electra the Electric Train, a character in Starlight Express
 Elektra King, in The World is not Enough
 Elektra (Tracy Beaker Returns character)
 Elektra, the princess of the Electric Eels from Sea Princesses

Film
 Electra (1962 film), based on the Euripides play
 Electra, a 1996 Shannon Tweed film
 Elektra (2005 film), a film based on the Marvel character
 Elektra (2010 film), a Malayalam psychological drama film

Music

Groups
 Electra (band), an electronic musical band from the United Kingdom
 Electra (Israeli band), an Israeli rock'n'roll band
 Elektra (band), a pop rock band from Iceland

Albums
 Electra (album), by Alice Caymmi
 Electra (Arild Andersen album)
 Elektra (Suspekt album), 2011
 Elektra: The Album, the soundtrack to the 2005 film

Songs
 "Electra" (song), a 2009 song by heavy metal band Dio

Operas
 Electra, by Johann Christian Friedrich Hæffner
 Elektra, by Mikis Theodorakis
 Elektra (opera), by Richard Strauss

Plays
 Electra (Euripides play)
 Electra (Sophocles play)
 Electra (Giraudoux play), 1930
 Electra (Wijesinha play), 1986
 Elektra, by Hugo von Hofmannsthal after Sophocles
 Elektra (started in 1949, first performed 1987), a play by Ezra Pound and Rudd Fleming
 Electra, a 1901 play written by Benito Pérez Galdós

Organisations and brands 
 Electra (arts organisation), London-based non-profit arts organisation
 Electra (company), electricity and water company in Cape Verde
 Electra Airways, airline
 Electra Bicycle Company, Vista, California-based bicycle brand/company
 Electra Guitars, brand of imported electric guitar of the 70s and 80s
 Electra Partners Europe, former name of European private equity firm Motion Equity Partners
 Elektra Berlin, a German association football club
 Elektra Records, U.S. record label
 Grupo Elektra, Mexican corporation
 Unbound Group, formerly Electra Private Equity, London-based listed investment trust

People
 Elektra (name) people and fictional characters with the given name or surname Elektra or variations thereof

Places

Terrestrial features
 Mount Electra
 Electra Lake

Outer space
 Electra (star), 17 Tauri
 130 Elektra, an asteroid

Municipalities
 Electra, California
 Electra, Texas
 Electra, Queensland, a locality in the Bundaberg Region, Queensland, Australia

Buildings
 Electra (San Diego), a condominium tower located in downtown San Diego
 Electra Building, Vancouver, a skyscraper
 Electra House, a building at 84 Moorgate, London, England
 Electra High School
 Electra Tower

Technology
 Electra, an iOS jailbreak app
 Electra (radio),  telecommunications transceiver for Mars spacecraft
 Electra (satellite), a project for a communications satellite with all-electric propulsion
 Electra (teletext), a teletext service from the early 1980s to the early 1990s
 Electra, a satellite also known as Explorer-1 Prime
 Elektra, a navigation system developed from the Lorenz beam
 Elektra (layout engine)

Transportation

Aircraft
 Lockheed L-188 Electra, an American turboprop airliner built by Lockheed
 Lockheed Model 10 Electra, a twin-engine, all-metal monoplane airliner from the 1930s
 Lockheed Model 12 Electra Junior, an eight-seat, six-passenger all-metal twin-engine transport aircraft of the late 1930s
 Lockheed Model 14 Super Electra, a civil cargo and passenger aircraft

Motor vehicles
 Buick Electra, full-size premium automobiles built by the Buick division of General Motors
 Harley-Davidson Electra Glide, a motorcycle in the FL model series since 1965

Rail
 Electra, an express electric locomotive of the type British Rail Class 77 built in 1953 for the Woodhead Line
 Electra, an early codename for the British Rail Class 91 electric locomotive
 Electra, a Great Western Railway Firefly class 2-2-2 locomotive

Ships
 HMS Electra, five ships
 USS Electra
 HS Elektra

Other uses
 Electra (typeface), a serif typeface
 Electra complex, a psychiatric concept

See also
 Électre, a 1782 opera by Jean-Baptiste Lemoyne on the myth of Electra